A Foolish Maiden (French: La vierge folle) is a 1929 French silent comedy film directed by Luitz-Morat and starring Emmy Lynn, Jean Angelo and Suzy Vernon.

The film's sets were designed by the art director Pierre Schild.

Cast
 Emmy Lynn as Fanny Armaury 
 Jean Angelo as Armaury 
 Suzy Vernon as Diane de Charance 
 Maurice Schutz as Le duc de Charance 
 Pierre Fresnay as Gaston de Charance 
 Simone Judic as Kerty 
 Marguerite de Morlaye as La duchesse du Charance

References

Bibliography
 Crisp, Colin. Genre, Myth and Convention in the French Cinema, 1929-1939. Indiana University Press, 2002.

External links

1929 films
Films directed by Luitz-Morat
French silent feature films
French comedy films
1929 comedy films
French films based on plays
French black-and-white films
Silent comedy films
1920s French films
1920s French-language films